Samuel Cooper Gardiner was an English born Canadian international lawn bowler.

Bowls career
He won a silver medal in the pairs at the 1954 British Empire and Commonwealth Games in Vancouver with Dick Williams and was the President of the North Vancouver Lawn Bowling Club.

Awards
Both he and Dick Williams were inducted into the North Shore Sports Hall of Fame in 1968.

Personal life
He emigrated to Canada at the age of 20.

References

1888 births
1968 deaths
Canadian male bowls players
Commonwealth Games silver medallists for Canada
Commonwealth Games medallists in lawn bowls
Bowls players at the 1954 British Empire and Commonwealth Games
British emigrants to Canada
Medallists at the 1954 British Empire and Commonwealth Games